Petre Șandor (born 1 February 1937) is a Romanian former sports shooter. He competed at the 1968 Summer Olympics and the 1972 Summer Olympics.

References

1937 births
Living people
Romanian male sport shooters
Olympic shooters of Romania
Shooters at the 1968 Summer Olympics
Shooters at the 1972 Summer Olympics
Sportspeople from Oradea